The Spain men's national field hockey team represents Spain in international men's field hockey and is controlled by the Royal Spanish Hockey Association, the governing body for field hockey in Spain.

Spain has competed in every World Cup since the first edition in 1971. They have won the EuroHockey Nations Championship twice and both the Champions Trophy and Champions Challenge once.

Tournament record

*Draws include matches decided on a penalty shoot-out.

Team

Current squad
The squad for the 2023 Men's FIH Hockey World Cup.

Head coach: Maximiliano Caldas

Recent call-ups
The following players have been called up for the national team in the last 12 months.

See also
Spain women's national field hockey team
Spain men's national under-21 field hockey team

References

External links

FIH profile

Field hockey
European men's national field hockey teams
National team men
Field hockey